Sahibzada Tasleem Ahmed Sabri is a  Pakistani television host of Islamic Television Channel ARY Qtv, a subsidiary of the ARY Digital Network which is available in Pakistan, the  Middle East, US, UK and Europe.

Early life and career
In the early 1990s, he started as a compere in Naat and Seerat programs at public gatherings and also on Pakistan Television Network.
He joined the ARY Digital Network, a television and media group, on their ARY Qtv channel in 2004.

Tasleem regularly conducts interviews of famous Pakistani personalities from different fields of life including religion, sports, business, media and social services.

Two CDs Tasleemat and Tasleem-o-Raza were released in 2006 & 2007 by him. His other TV programs are also publicly available.Tasleem Ahmed Sabri's Naats on pakistantimes.com newspaper website, Retrieved 10 July 2017    He is hosting a live programme for last 5 years known as Night time'', in which famous Islamic scholars are being invited to discuss certain Islamic issues in depth on a regular basis. Muslims from all over the world take part in this programme by having a 'live telephone question and answer session' to have a better understanding of Islam. He has travelled to countries such as India, United Arab Emirates, UK and Saudi Arabia on invitation for such programs.

References

External links
Official YouTube channel
http://www.arydigital.tv/
Naat video clips of Tasleem Ahmed Sabri on urduwire.com website
http://www.aryqtv.tv/
http://www.tasleemsabri.com/

Living people
Pakistani television hosts
Islamic music
Islamic poetry
Pakistani performers of Islamic music
Year of birth missing (living people)
Chishti-Sabiris